Stijn Van Cauter is a doom metal and ambient music producer from Belgium. He has several solo projects, including Beyond Black Void, I Dream No More, and Fall of the Grey-Winged One. His most notable solo project is Until Death Overtakes Me.

Music career

1997-2001
Van Cauter had been experimenting with music production since 1997. In May 1999, he founded the doom metal project Macabre Destiny. He decided to change the name of the project to Until Death Overtakes Me in February 2000. Three new members, "EDS", Jo Renette, and "PT", joined the project that same year, transforming it into a band.

In 2001, Van Cauter began recording the demo Deep Dark Red by himself. He decided to abandon the use of drums and started using timpani instead. The demo was not released because it had involved earlier material drafted by Van Cauter alone, and he thought it would not represent the band properly. While recording the second demo, Absence of Life, "EDS" and "PT" left the band. Renette also left the band after the recording was complete.

2002-present

With the departure of all other band members, Van Cauter decided to transform Until Death Overtakes Me into a solo project once again. He released his first album, Symphony I: Deep Dark Red, in February 2002.

Shortly after that, Van Cauter began exploring other musical genres and emerged with new solo projects. He then founded the one-man project I Dream No More.

Van Cauter says he discovered the drone doom genre while working on his first album for I Dream No More, called Fade - Die, which was released in April 2002. He experimented with making heavy drone sounds on a bass guitar. As a result, he started yet another solo project, called Fall of the Grey-Winged One. In June 2002 he released the album Aeons of Dreams. Van Cauter describes the album as "drone sound with some ambient and industrial elements."

Around May of that year, Van Cauter dropped out of school. The excess free time allowed him to concentrate on his music, and as a result he founded three more solo projects: The Ethereal, Organium and Dreams of Dying Stars.

In January 2003, he released the first album, Desolate, under Beyond Black Void. In the summer of that year Van Cauter joined the doom metal band Pantheist, as a live musician. He remained in the band for the next 10 months, during which he has toured with it, on one occasion alongside funeral doom pioneers Skepticism.

He was also asked to record the vocals for one track in Pantheist's debut album.

In May 2003, Van Cauter founded a small record label, called NULLL Records. 

He started two more projects, Tear Your Soul Apart - intent on experimenting more with ambient and noise sounds, and the more drone-focused In The Mist. Van Cauter says that the album Lost, released under In The Mist, is one of his most favourite works.

Influences
Van Cauter says that he has a rather grim worldview. According to his website, his music is influenced by his own way of life, his dreams, feelings, and a striving to honor true music.

Personal life
Van Cauter enjoys graphic design and is the owner and founder of the record label NULLL Records.

Discography
Stijn Van Cauter has several solo projects. His discography is listed here per project.

Aeonic Dirge 
 2017: Beta Crucis
 2017: Sigma Lunaris
 2019: Markab Sinistris
 2021: Dreamer of Stars
 2023: Rift Spirits

Arcane Voidsplitter 
 2017: To Reach Beyond
 2019: Voice of the Stars
 2020: Cosmic Mind
 2022: Cold Stars

Artix Intex 
 2018: Aberrancis'''

 Bateaux Inconnus 
 2018: Slow Rivers 2022: Seas and MirrorsBeyond Black Void
 2003: Desolate 2010: Eridanus Supervoid 2011: Neyon Moru 2019: Voidgaze 2021: Wraith Crack Catnoms For Fluffy 
 2017: Flight 2018: Vast 2020: MoonCold Aeon
 2008: Infra Sub Ultra 2021: Frostverse Desperandum Gothica 
 2017: I 2018: II 2022: IIIDreams of Dying Stars
 2003: Stardance 2004: Interludium II - Aeon E 2004: Funeral in the Void 2005: Interludium V - Buried in the Void Ekket-Faug 
 2022: Reaching Lichdom SupremeFall of the Grey-Winged One
 2002: Aeons of Dreams 2003: Death Time Emptiness 2004: Interludium III - Inritus 2009: Channelers 2020: Propagating Drone Fields 2020: The Hive 2021: Propagating Drone FieldsForbidden Fields
 2003: Field I: Night 2009: Field II: of Trees... 2020: Field III: New Voyages 2021: Field IV: The MysticGruulvoqh
 2018: The End of Gruulvoqh 2019: The Eternal Traveller 2021: Dreams of the SavantI Dream No More
 2000: Until Death Overtakes Me/I Dream No More 2002: Fade – Die 2009: I Dream No More/Dios Incandescente 2010: La Ultima Frontera 2020: The Final Border 2022: The Citadel Fleets of Ekket-FaugIn Somnis
 2003: The Memory You’ve BecomeIn the Mist
 2002: Lost 2018: A Return to the Mist Inframonolithium 
 2017: Demo I: Laments 2018: Mysterium 2019: The Lightless Nachtwald Weitstrider 
 2017: Sternwald 2018: Wächter des Waldes 2020: Forests of the Old World 2022: The Wizard’s PathOrganium
 2006: The Rage 2007: Interludium IV - LevitationTear Your Soul Apart
 2002: Undigested Remains 2003: In PainThe Ethereal
 2002: From Funeral Skies 2008: Infra Sub Ultra 2010: Endlight The Nulll Collective 
 2009: Silent Night 2010: Exocation 2010: RepulsUgloid 2010: De Monstris 2010: Cerberus Trisector 2010: Jingle Bells 2022: Cerberus Tirsector The Sad Sun 
 2004: Church of the Flagellation 2008: Infra Sub Ultra 2009: The Sad Sun The Sonitus Ignotus Ensemble 
 2017: Christmas Though and Dreams 	
Until Death Overtakes Me
 2000: Until Death Overtakes Me / I Dream No More 2001: Symphony I - Deep Dark Red 2001: Symphony II - Absence of Life 2002: Symphony I - Deep Dark Red 2003: Prelude to Monolith 2004: Interludium I - Funeral Path 2006: Symphony III - Monolith 2009: Days Without Hope 2016: Well of Dreams 2016: Antemortem 2017: Hell & Rain 2017: Flow of Infinity 2018: They Know 2018: Missing 2019: Herald of Sorrow 2020: And Be No More 2021: As Dead as Time 2022: Collapse of Light 2023: Decay Into Irrelevance''

References

External links
 Stijn Van Cauter on Myspace

Belgian electronic musicians
Living people
Year of birth missing (living people)